Slobozia Conachi is a commune in Galați County, Western Moldavia, Romania with a population of 7,178 people. It is composed of two villages, Izvoarele and Slobozia Conachi. It also included Cuza Vodă village until 2005, when it was split off to form a separate commune.

References

Communes in Galați County
Localities in Western Moldavia